Mar de Colores (English: Sea of Colors) is the second studio album by Spanish-German singer-songwriter Álvaro Soler. It was released on 7 September 2018 by Airforce1 Records and Universal Music.

An expanded version of the deluxe edition of the album, subtitled Versión Extendida, was released on 10 May 2019. It features three new songs, "Loca", "La Libertad" and "Taro".

Track listing

Charts

Weekly charts

Year-end charts

Certifications

References

2018 albums
Álvaro Soler albums
Spanish-language albums